The 1971 Women's Tennis Circuit consisted of a number of tennis tournaments for female tennis players. It was composed of two series of events (circuits or tours); the Virginia Slims Circuit and the ILTF Pepsi Grand Prix as well as non-tour events.

Virginia Slims Circuit 
Prior to the establishment of this circuit there was an inequality between the prize money purses for male and female tennis players which gave rise to complaints from a number of the leading female tennis players of the time. Nine of them, including Billie Jean King, became later known as the "Original 9" after being banned from the then existing multi-gender invitational professional events run by the influential United States Lawn Tennis Association (USLTA) due to their boycotting of the Pacific Southwest Championships. This resulted in the first Virginia Slims-sponsored event being held in September 1970 in Houston, an event which laid the groundwork for the establishment of the annual Virginia Slims Circuit the following year. In 1971 the total prize money available from the Virginia Slims events was $309,100 and Billie Jean King became the first female athlete in history to earn more than $100,000 in one season.

Schedule 
This is a calendar of all events sponsored by Virginia Slims in the year 1971, with player progression documented from the quarterfinals stage. The table also includes the Grand Slam tournaments and the 1971 Federation Cup.

Key

December (1970)

January

February

March

April

May

June

July

August

September

October

November

December

Grand Prix Circuit

Points system 
The Grand Prix tournaments were divided into four groups. Group A consisted of the three Grand Slam events – French Open, Wimbledon Championships and US Open – while the other tournaments were divided into Groups B, C and D by prize money and draw size. Points were allocated based on these groups and the finishing position of a player in a tournament. The points allocation is listed below:

Standings and bonus pool earnings 
A bonus pool of $50,000 was available for the top 13 points ranked players. To qualify for a share of the bonus pool the players had to participate in a minimum of nine tournaments.

Rankings 
The 1971 singles rankings as per Lance Tingay.

Prize money leaders

Statistical information 
These tables present the number of singles (S), doubles (D), and mixed doubles (X) titles won by each player and each nation during the 1971 Virginia Slims Circuit. They also include data for the Grand Slam tournaments.

 total number of titles (a doubles title won by two players representing the same nation counts as only one win for the nation);
 highest amount of highest category tournaments (for example, having a single Grand Slam gives preference over any kind of combination without a Grand Slam title);
 a singles > doubles > mixed doubles hierarchy;
 alphabetical order (by family names for players).

Key

Titles won by player

Titles won by nation

See also 
 1971 World Championship Tennis circuit
 1971 Grand Prix tennis circuit

Notes

References

External links 
 Women's Tennis Association (WTA) official website
 International Tennis Federation (ITF) official website

 
Virginia Slims Circuit
WTA Tour seasons